Please Don't Go may refer to:
 "Please Don't Go" (2NE1 song), 2009
 "Please Don't Go" (Boyz II Men song), 1992
 "Please Don't Go" (Donald Peers song), a song written by Les Reed and Jackie Rae
 "Please Don't Go" (Joel Adams song), 2015
 "Please Don't Go" (KC and the Sunshine Band song), 1979
 Covered by Basshunter on Now You're Gone – The Album, 2008
 "Please Don't Go" (KWS song), 1992
 "Please Don't Go" (Mike Posner song), 2010
 "Please Don't Go" (Nayobe song), 1984
 "Please Don't Go" (No Mercy song), 1997
 "Please Don't Go" (Tank song), 2007
 "Please Don't Go", a song by Immature from We Got It, 1995
 "Please Don't Go", a song by Petula Clark from Colour My World, 1967
 "Please Don't Go", a song by Six60, 2019
 "Please Don't Go", a song by the Bicycles from The Good, the Bad and the Cuddly, 2006

See also 
 "Plz Don't Go", a song by Cashmere Cat from 9, 2017
 "Please Don't Go Girl", a song by New Kids on the Block, 1988
 "Baby, Please Don't Go", a blues song first recorded by Big Joe Williams, 1935